George Gebro (born 13 September 1981) is a retired Liberian footballer.

International career
He is also a member of the Liberia national football team and also serves on the coaching staff of the youth team.

References

1981 births
Living people
Liberian footballers
Liberia international footballers
Liberian expatriate footballers
Association football midfielders
Cypriot First Division players
A.O. Kerkyra players
AEL Limassol players
Ethnikos Achna FC players
Invincible Eleven players
Panetolikos F.C. players
Patraikos F.C. players
Panachaiki F.C. players
ENTHOI Lakatamia FC players
Hapoel Petah Tikva F.C. players
Expatriate footballers in Israel
Expatriate footballers in Cyprus
Expatriate footballers in Hungary
2002 African Cup of Nations players
Sportspeople from Monrovia